The 1943 Belle Vue Harel Massacre refers to a significant strike which escalated into riots amongst labourers working in the fields of the Belle Vue Harel Sugar Estate, near the village of Belle Vue Harel on the island of Mauritius in September 1943.  The riots led to the death of 4 people with an additional 16 people being injured.

Events prior to the massacre

Letter of demand
In December 1942 labourers of Belle Vue Harel Sugar Estate were dissatisfied with the low wages being paid by the estate owners, the Harel and Rousset clans. Four of these workers (Andrée Moonsamy, Hurrynanan Boykount, Sirkisson Seenath and Kistnasamy Mooneesamy) wrote and signed a letter on behalf of all the estate's workers and sent it to the Director of Labour Department to ask for fairer compensation.

Strike of 14 days
As there was no response to their letter labourers at Belle Vue Harel Sugar Estate started to strike on 13 September 1943 in protest. They nominated Hurryparsad Ramnarain and Sharma Jugdambee to represent their interests on the Conciliation Board. In those days the interests of owners and growers of sugar cane were represented by the Labour Department and it was common practice for such conflicts to be resolved via the Conciliation Board meetings. On 17 September 1943 at a meeting of the Conciliation Board the Labour Department proposed an agreement to the 2 representatives Ramnarain and Jugdambee. Unfortunately these representatives failed to consult with the striking workers. A conflict of interest was also at play given that Ramnarain worked as a propagandist within the Department of Information which was headed by the Acting Director of Labour who also happened to be Chairman of the Conciliation Board. As a result the labourers of Belle Vue Harel rejected the new agreement and refused to resume work. They demanded the appointment of a new Conciliation Board and a fairer agreement.

Seven days later on 24 September 1943 the owners of the sugar estate threatened workers who did not abide by his agreement to leave his sugar estate within 5 days. As the deadline of 29 September approached the owners and Labour Department had made arrangements with the local police to put an end to the strike.

Police intervention
On 27 September 1943 the workers organised a sit-in within the premises of the sugar estate. Police Constable Thancanamootoo disguised as a labourer was sent to the meeting to check on the striking labourers. However his cover was blown and the workers assaulted him. He fled to the estate manager's office and waited for his boss to arrive.

Deputy Commissioner of Police Allan Bell and Assistant Superintendent of Police Fondaumière eventually arrived with several armed policemen. They decided to proceed to the arrest of PC Thancanamootoo's aggressor but encountered a crowd of between 200 and 300 men, women, and children armed with sticks and stones. They surrounded and outnumbered the police and refused to give up their sticks and stones.

Deaths
In an attempt to disperse the crowd police fired 16 shots and even a tear gas grenade at the crowd, resulting in 3 deaths, 5 labourers with bullet wounds and 12 others with slight injuries. Nine days later on 6 October 1943 a fourth labourer (Marday Panapen) died at the Civil Hospital in Port Louis, as a result of his bullet wounds. 
The three dead labourers were Soondrum Pavatdan (better known as Anjalay Coopen, a 32 year old pregnant woman), Kistnasamy Mooneesamy (37 year old labourer), and Moonsamy Moonien (14 year old boy). Munien Munusami, who witnessed and survived the 1943 shooting, died in 2006 at the age of 84. Munusami recalled that the shooting outside a baitka had coincided with a religious ceremony and the strike.

Legacy
Basdeo Bissoondoyal the social worker and founder of the Jan Andolan movement organised the funeral ceremony of the four victims of the police shootings and it was attended by more than 1500 individuals.

The 1943 Belle Vue Harel Massacre took place 6 years after the Uba riots of 1937 in the same part of the world. Although the root causes are not the same they highlight the struggles and vulnerability of the Indo-Mauritian labourers and planters whose ancestors migrated to Mauritius under the British colonial rule.  On 1 October 1943 a Commission of Enquiry was instigated and the Commissioners consisted of S. Moody, Dr. Eugène Laurent, Hon A. M. Osman, Mr the Justice G. Espitalier-Noel and His Honour Mr Rampersad Neerunjun. The Moody Commission of Enquiry report (published in 1944) reiterated several findings of the Hooper Commission which had followed the earlier 1937 UBA riots. Moreover they were very critical of the Police and of the Labour Department's failure to resolve this matter peacefully.

The victims of the 1943 massacre at Belle Vue Harel were commemorated by Mauritian singer Siven Chinien in his song L'année 1943 which was released in his 1970s album Ratsitatane, Conscience Noire.

The Government of Mauritius has acknowledged the historical importance of the massacre. Between 1995 and 2007 monuments and statues of Anjalay Coopen have been erected in the capital city Port Louis as well as in the village of Cottage. The Anjalay Stadium was also named after one of the four who died, Anjalay.

References

1943 in Mauritius
1943 labor disputes and strikes
1943 riots
September 1943 events
Murder in Mauritius
History of Mauritius
Riots and civil disorder in Mauritius
Ethnic riots
People shot dead by law enforcement officers
Anti-Indian racism in Africa
Massacres in 1943
1943 murders in Africa